Scolopsis margaritifera, commonly known as pearly monocle bream, is a fish native to the western Pacific Ocean.

References

External links
 
 Pearly Monocle Bream & Fishes of Australia

margaritifera
Fish of Indonesia
Fauna of Queensland
Fish described in 1830